Michel Bruguier (17 November 1921 - 16 March 1967) was a French lawyer and resistance fighter.

Early life and education 
Michel Bruguier was born on November 17, 1921 in Carcassonne he was the son of Georges Bruguier. Once he moved to Paris he joined the preparatory classes of the Lycée Henri-IV.

Career 
During World War II, Bruguier joined a combat network, becoming its departmental manager in July 1942. He was imprisoned from 1942 to 1943. Subsequently freed, he was appointed as a regional inspector of the Mouvements Unis de la Résistance. He was later promoted to chief of the French Forces of the Interior of the Gard (under the wartime name of “Commandant Audibert”). Bruguier then joined the departmental liberation committee of Gard, as he used to be a student there. He would later join the French Communist Party.

Bruguier studied in law and plead several cases through his career; most notably the defense of Mehdi Ben Barka in company of René Thorp.

He died of a brain haemorrhage on March 16, 1967.

Distinctions 
 Legion of Honour
 Croix de Guerre 1939–1945
 Resistance Medal

Gallery

References

1921 births
1967 deaths
French politicians
French socialists
People from Gard